The 2017 Rhythmic Gymnastics European Championships was the 33rd edition of the Rhythmic Gymnastics European Championships, which took place on 19–21 May 2017 at the László Papp Budapest Sports Arena. in Budapest, Hungary.

Participating countries

Competition schedule
Friday May 19
10:00-12:00 CI junior groups 1st presentation
13:00-15:00 CI seniors individual hoop and ball Group A
15:15-17:15 CI seniors individual hoop and ball Group B
18:30-20:15 CI seniors individual hoop and ball Group C
Saturday May 20
11:00-12:10 CII junior groups and senior individual round I
12:20-13:40 CII junior groups and senior individual round II
13:50-15:10 CII junior groups and senior individual round III
15:20-16:40 CII junior groups and senior individual round IV
17:00-18:00 CII junior groups and senior individual round V
18:10-19:10 CII junior groups and senior individual round VI
19:20-20:20 CII junior groups and senior individual round VII
Sunday May 21
11:00-11:45 CIII Apparatus finals junior groups
12:20-13:10 CIII Apparatus finals seniors hoop and ball
13:15-14:05 CIII Apparatus finals seniors clubs and ribbon
Source:

Medal winners

Results

Team

Senior Individual

Hoop

Ball

Clubs

Ribbon

Junior Group

10 Clubs

Medal count

References

Rhythmic Gymnastics European Championships
European Rhythmic Gymnastics Championships
International sports competitions in Budapest
International gymnastics competitions hosted by Hungary
2017 in Hungarian sport
May 2017 sports events in Europe